José Andía (born 26 March 1898, date of death unknown) was a Spanish athlete. He competed in the men's individual cross country event at the 1924 Summer Olympics.

References

External links
 

1898 births
Year of death missing
Athletes (track and field) at the 1924 Summer Olympics
Spanish male long-distance runners
Olympic athletes of Spain
Athletes from Madrid
Olympic cross country runners